Four Years or 4 Years may refer to:

 "Four Years", a song by Jon McLaughlin from OK Now
 "Four Years", a song by The Story So Far from Under Soil and Dirt
 Olympiad, period of four years associated with the Olympic Games of the Ancient Greeks
 Four-year plan, a series of economic measures initiated by Adolf Hitler in Nazi Germany in 1936

See also